Dysschema buckleyi is a moth of the family Erebidae. It was described and recorded by Herbert Druce in 1910. It is found in Ecuador.

References

Dysschema
Moths described in 1910